Jesus Justus (Greek Ιησούς χω λεγόμενος Ιουστος Iesous ho legomenos Ioustos) was one of several Jewish Christians in the church at Rome mentioned by Paul the Apostle in the greetings at the end of the Epistle to the Colossians 4:11.

It is generally thought that Paul wrote Colossians while in prison in Rome most likely during AD 50s. Of those with Paul, Justus, Aristarchus, and Mark, the cousin of Barnabas, are said in the letter to be "of the circumcision", that is, Jewish and to have "proved a comfort to me."

The name Jesus was common among Jews in the time of Jesus of Nazareth, being a form of the Old Testament name Joshua (Yeshua ישוע). The extra name "Justus" was likely to distinguish him from his Master, Jesus Christ.

Jesus Justus is not mentioned in a similar passage in Philemon 1:23-24 whereas Aristarchus, Epaphras and Mark are again explicitly named by Paul.

References

 Hastings, J. (1963). Dictionary of the bible. 2nd ed. New York: Charles Scribner's Sons.
 Cox, S. (2006). The new testament and literature. Peru, IL: Open Court.
 Feldman, Louis H. & Hata, Gohei. (1988). Josephus, the bible and history. Tokyo, Japan: Yamamoto Shoten Publishing House.

People in the Pauline epistles
Early Jewish Christians
1st-century Jews